The Office of the President of Azerbaijan is the executive administration of President of Azerbaijan. The office is in charge of fulfilling the constitutional responsibilities of the President. The headquarters of office is located on Istiglaliyyat Street of the capital city, Baku.

History
The Office of the President of Azerbaijan was established on 18 May 1990. The administration is located in a twelve-story building with surface made of marble and granite. The construction of the building, initiated by the First Secretary of Communist Party of Azerbaijan SSR Heydar Aliyev and supervised by project manager Fuad Orujov and architects Tahir Allahverdiyev and Madat Khalafov, was started in 1978 and completed in 1986. It was then occupied by the Central Committee of the Communist Party of Azerbaijan. After 18 May 1990, the building was assigned to the President of Azerbaijan and his administration and it was renamed the Presidential Palace in 2003.

Structure
The Office of the Head of the Presidential Administration of Azerbaijan was headed by Ramiz Mehdiyev, and currently is headed by Samir Nuriyev. The structure of the office is as follows:

 Assistants to the President of the Republic of Azerbaijan
 Secretariat of the First Vice-President of the Republic of Azerbaijan 
Assistant to the President - Head of the Department of State Control Affairs
 Assistant to the President - Head of the Department for Territorial and Organizational Issues
Assistant to the President - Head of the Department of Military Affairs
 Assistant to the President - Head of the Department for Work with Law Enforcement Bodies 
 Assistant to the President - Head of the Department of Foreign Affairs
Assistant to the President - Head of the Department of Economic Issues and Innovative Development Policy
 Assistant to the President - Head of the Department of Economic Policy and Industrial Issues 
 Press Secretary of the President
 Protocol Service of the President 
 Department of Civil Service and Human Resources Issues 
 Department of Youth Policy and Sport Issues 
 Department of Humanitarian Policy, Diaspora, Multiculturalism and Religious Issues
 Department of Legal Expertise
Department of Legislation and Legal Policy
Department for Work and Communication with NGOs
Department for Relations with Political Parties and Legislative Authority 
 Department for Work with Documents 
 Department for Work with Citizens' Inquiries
 Administrative Department

See also
Government of Azerbaijan
Cabinet of Azerbaijan
National Assembly of Azerbaijan
Fuad Alasgarov

References

External links
Presidential apparatus on map of Baku, Azerbaijan

 
Government of Azerbaijan
Politics of Azerbaijan
1990 establishments in Azerbaijan